Henny Johanne Marie Lauritzen (5 April 1871 – 7 December 1938) was a Danish stage and film actress of the silent era in Denmark. She worked under directors such as August Blom and Lau Lauritzen Sr.

Selected filmography
En slem Dreng (1915)
Familien Pille som Spejdere (1915)
 The Mysterious Footprints (1918)

External links

Henny Lauritzen at the Danish Film Institute

20th-century Danish actresses
Danish stage actresses
Danish film actresses
Danish silent film actresses
1871 births
1938 deaths